Philip John Algernon Sidney, 2nd Viscount De L'Isle,  (born 21 April 1945) is a British peer and former soldier.

Life and career
Lord De L'Isle is the only son of William Sidney, 1st Viscount De L'Isle and his wife Jacqueline (née Vereker), a daughter of Field Marshal John Vereker, 6th Viscount Gort. He was educated at Tabley House, Mons Officer Cadet School and the Royal Military Academy Sandhurst. After service in the Rifle Brigade, in 1966, he became a major in the Grenadier Guards and took early retirement in 1979, having spent some of his service in Northern Ireland during The Troubles.

De L'Isle was appointed Vice-Lieutenant of Kent in 2002 and is also a Freeman of the City of London and a member of the Worshipful Company of Goldsmiths. On 1 September 2011, he was appointed Lord Lieutenant of Kent. He was appointed Commander of the Order of Saint John in 2012 and Commander of the Royal Victorian Order (CVO) in the 2019 Birthday Honours.

Marriage and family
On 15 November 1980, De L'Isle married Isobel Tresyllian Compton, youngest daughter of the civil servant Sir Edmund Compton. They have two children: Sophia Jacqueline Mary Sidney (born 1983) and Philip William Edmund Sidney (born 1985).

De L'Isle succeeded to his father's titles in 1991. The family seat is Penshurst Place in Kent.

References

External links

1945 births
Alumni of Trinity College, Cambridge
British military personnel of The Troubles (Northern Ireland)
Commanders of the Royal Victorian Order
Deputy Lieutenants of Kent
English people of Dutch descent
Graduates of the Mons Officer Cadet School
Graduates of the Royal Military Academy Sandhurst
Grenadier Guards officers
Living people
Members of the Order of the British Empire
People educated at Eton College
Rifle Brigade officers
Schuyler family
Viscounts De L'Isle
Shelley baronets, of Castle Goring
Barons De L'Isle and Dudley
De L'Isle